The 2009 St. Petersburg Bowl was the second edition of the college football bowl game and was played at Tropicana Field in St. Petersburg, Florida.  The game began at 8:00 PM US EST on Saturday, December 19, 2009, was telecast on ESPN and featured the UCF of Conference USA and Rutgers of the Big East.  Rutgers defeated UCF 45–24 in a game where Mohamed Sanu, the game's MVP, caught 4 passes for 97 yards and a touchdown in addition to rushing 14 times for 47 yards and two touchdowns. Through sponsorship from the Beef O'Brady's restaurant franchise, the game was officially known as the 2009 St. Petersburg Bowl presented by Beef 'O' Brady's.

The game marked the Scarlet Knights' fifth consecutive bowl appearance, and their fourth consecutive victory, after not playing in a bowl game from 1979 to 2005.  Rutgers was one of nine BCS teams to win a bowl game in each of the last three seasons.  This was UCF's third bowl game, the last one was in the 2007 Liberty Bowl.  With the loss, Central Florida dropped to 0–3 in the postseason. The bowl game marked the first ever meeting between Rutgers and UCF, both teams being called "Knights".

Game summary
Rutgers wore their home red uniforms, and UCF wore their away white uniforms.

Scoring summary

References

External links
Box score at ESPN

St. Petersburg Bowl
Gasparilla Bowl
Rutgers Scarlet Knights football bowl games
UCF Knights football bowl games
St. Petersburg Bowl
21st century in St. Petersburg, Florida